The Quraysh were a grouping of Arab clans that historically inhabited and controlled the city of Mecca and its Kaaba. The Islamic prophet Muhammad was born into the Hashim clan of the tribe. Despite this, many of the Quraysh staunchly opposed Muhammad, until converting to Islam en masse in  CE. Afterwards, leadership of the Muslim community traditionally passed to a member of the Quraysh, as was the case with the Rashidun, Umayyad, Abbasid, and purportedly the Fatimid caliphates.

Name
Sources differ as to the etymology of Quraysh, with one theory holding that it was the diminutive form of qirsh (shark). The 9th-century genealogist Hisham ibn al-Kalbi asserted that there was no eponymous founder of Quraysh; rather, the name stemmed from taqarrush, an Arabic word meaning "a coming together" or "association". The Quraysh gained their name when Qusayy ibn Kilab, a sixth-generation descendant of Fihr ibn Malik, gathered together his kinsmen and took control of the Ka'aba. Prior to this, Fihr's offspring lived in scattered, nomadic groups among their Kinana relatives. The nisba or surname of the Quraysh is Qurashī, though in the early centuries of the Islamic Ummah, most Qurayshi tribesmen were denoted by their specific clan instead of the tribe. Later, particularly after the 13th century, claimants of Qurayshi descent used the Qurashī surname.

History

Origins
The Quraysh's progenitor was Fihr ibn Malik, whose full genealogy, according to traditional Arab sources, was the following: Fihr ibn Mālik ibn al-Naḍr ibn Kināna ibn Khuzayma ibn Mudrika ibn Ilyās ibn Muḍar ibn Nizār ibn Maʿadd ibn ʿAdnān. Thus, Fihr belonged to the Kinana tribe and his descent is traced to Adnan the Ishmaelite, the semi-legendary father of the "northern Arabs". According to the traditional sources, Fihr led the warriors of Kinana and Khuzayma in defense of the Ka'ba, at the time a major pagan sanctuary in Mecca, against tribes from Yemen; however, the sanctuary and the privileges associated with it continued to be in the hands of the Yemeni Khuza'a tribe. The Quraysh gained their name when Qusayy ibn Kilab, a sixth-generation descendant of Fihr ibn Malik, gathered together his kinsmen and took control of the Ka'ba. Prior to this, Fihr's offspring lived in scattered, nomadic groups among their Kinana relatives.

Establishment in Mecca
All medieval Muslim sources agree that Qusayy unified Fihr's descendants, and established the Quraysh as the dominant power in Mecca. After conquering Mecca, Qusayy assigned quarters to different Qurayshi clans. Those settled around the Ka'ba were known Quraysh al-Biṭāḥ, and included all of the descendants of Ka'b ibn Lu'ayy and others. The clans settled in the outskirts of the sanctuary were known as Quraysh al-Ẓawāhīr. According to historian Ibn Ishaq, Qusayy's younger son, Abd Manaf, had grown prominent during his father's lifetime and was chosen by Qusayy to be his successor as the guardian of the Ka'ba. He also gave other responsibilities related to the Ka'ba to his other sons Abd al-'Uzza and Abd, while ensuring that all decisions by the Quraysh had to be made in the presence of his eldest son Abd al-Dar; the latter was also designated ceremonial privileges such as keeper of the Qurayshi war banner and supervisor of water and provisions to the pilgrims visiting the Ka'ba.

According to historian F. E. Peters, Ibn Ishaq's account reveals that Mecca in the time of Qusayy and his immediate offspring was not yet a commercial center; rather, the city's economy was based on pilgrimage to the Ka'ba, and "what pass[ed] for municipal offices [designated by Qusayy] have to do only with military operations and with control of the shrine". During that time, the tribesmen of Quraysh were not traders; instead, they were entrusted with religious services, from which they significantly profited. They also profited from taxes collected from incoming pilgrims. Though Qusayy appeared to be the strongman of Quraysh, he was not officially a king of the tribe, but one of many leading sheikhs (tribal chieftains).

According to historian Gerald R. Hawting, if the traditional sources are to be believed, Qusayy's children, "must have lived in the second half of the fifth century". However, historian W. Montgomery Watt asserts that Qusayy himself likely died in the second half of the 6th century. The issue of succession between Qusayy's natural successor, Abd al-Dar, and his chosen successor, Abd Manaf, led to the division of Quraysh into two factions; those who backed the Abd al-Dar clan, including the clans of Banu Sahm, Banu Adi, Banu Makhzum and Banu Jumah, became known as al-Aḥlāf (the Confederates), while those who backed the Abd Manaf clan, including the Banu Taym, Banu Asad, Banu Zuhra and Banu al-Harith ibn Fihr, were known as al-Muṭayyabūn.

Control of Meccan trade
Toward the end of the 6th century, the Fijar War broke out between the Quraysh and the Kinana on one side and various Qaysi tribes on the other, including the Hawazin, Banu Thaqif, Banu Amir and Banu Sulaym. The war broke out when a Kinani tribesman killed an Amiri tribesman escorting a Lakhmid caravan to the Hejaz. The attack took place during the holy season when fighting was typically forbidden. The Kinani tribesman's patron was Harb ibn Umayya, a Qurayshi chief. This patron and other chiefs were ambushed by the Hawazin at Nakhla, but were able to escape. In the battles that occurred in the following two years, the Qays were victorious, but in the fourth year, the tide turned in favor of the Quraysh and Kinana. After a few more clashes, peace was reestablished. According to Watt, the actual aim in the Fijar War was control of the trade routes of Najd. Despite particularly tough resistance by the Quraysh's main trade rivals, the Thaqif of Ta'if, and the Banu Nasr clan of Hawazin, the Quraysh ultimately held sway over western Arabian trade. The Quraysh gained control over Ta'if's trade, and many Qurayshi individuals purchased estates in Ta'if, where the climate was cooler.

The sanctuary village of Mecca developed into a major Arabian trade hub. According to Watt, by 600 CE, the leaders of Quraysh "were prosperous merchants who had obtained something like a monopoly of the trade between the Indian Ocean and East Africa on the one hand and the Mediterranean on the other". Furthermore, the Quraysh commissioned trade caravans to Yemen in the winter and caravans to Gaza, Bosra, Damascus and al-Arish in the summer. The Quraysh established networks with merchants in these Syrian cities. They also formed political or economic alliances with many of the Bedouin (nomadic Arab) tribes in the northern and central Arabian deserts to ensure the safety of their trade caravans. The Quraysh invested their revenues in building their trading ventures, and shared profits with tribal allies to translate financial fortune into significant political power in the Hejaz (western Arabia). In the words of Fred Donner:

[By the end of the 6th century,] Meccan commerce was flourishing as never before, and the leaders in this trade [the Quraysh] had developed from mere merchants into true financiers. They were no longer interested in "buying cheap and selling dear," but also with organizing money and men to realize their commercial objectives. There was emerging, in short, a class of men with well-developed managerial and organizational skills. It was a development unheralded, and almost unique, in central Arabia.

The Banu Makhzum and Banu Umayya, in particular, acquired vast wealth from trade and held the most influence among the Quraysh in Meccan politics. The Banu Umayya and the Banu Nawfal, another clan descending from Abd Manaf that had become wealthy from their commercial enterprise, split from the Muṭayyabūn faction in 605 and engaged in business with the Aḥlāf. Their financial fortunes had enabled them to become a force of their own. During a commercial incident were a yemenite merchant was robbed of his trade by al-As ibn Wa'il al-Sahmi, the Muṭayyabūn reformed in the Hilf al-Fudul, which consisted of the Banu Hashim and Banu Muttalib, which, like the Banu Umayya, were descendants of Abd Manaf, and the Taym, Asad, Zuhra and al-Harith ibn Fihr clans. The Banu Hashim held the hereditary rights surrounding the pilgrimage to the Ka'ba, though the Banu Umayya were ultimately the strongest Qurayshi clan. According to Watt, "In all the stories of the pre-Islamic period there is admittedly a legendary element, but the main outline of events appears to be roughly correct, even if most of the dating is uncertain."

Conflict with Muhammad

The polytheistic Quraysh opposed the monotheistic message preached by the Islamic prophet Muhammad, himself a Qurayshi from the Banu Hashim. The tribe harassed members of the nascent Muslim community, and attempted to harm Muhammad, but he was protected by his uncle Abu Talib. To escape persecution, Muhammad and his companions, including the Qurayshi Abu Bakr, emigrated to Medina. Muhammad then confronted a Qurayshi caravan returning from Palestine and defeated the Quraysh at the ensuing Battle of Badr in 624. The Quraysh later besieged the Muslims at Medina in 627, but were defeated in the Battle of the Trench. The Treaty of Hudaybiyya was then signed between Muhammad and the Quraysh in 628, but was violated because of a dispute between Bedouin tribes from each camp. In January 630, Muhammad moved to finally settle the conflict with Quraysh and returned with his followers to capture Mecca.

Islamic leadership

In 630, Muhammad entered Mecca victoriously, prompting the rest of Quraysh to embrace Islam. Muhammad sought to consolidate the unity of his expanding Muslim community by "winning over this powerful group [the Quraysh]", according to Donner; to that end he guaranteed Qurayshi participation and influence in the nascent Islamic state. Thus, despite their long enmity with Muhammad, the Quraysh were brought in as political and economic partners and became a key component in the Muslim elite. Many leading Qurayshi tribesmen were installed in key government positions and in Muhammad's policy-making circle. According to Donner, the inclusion of Quraysh "in the ruling elite of the Islamic state was very probably responsible for what appears to be the more carefully organized and systematic approach to statesmanship practiced by Muhammad in the closing years of his life, as the organizational skills of the Quraysh were put to use in the service of Islam".

With Muhammad's death in 632, rivalry emerged between the Quraysh and the two other components of the Muslim elite, the Ansar and the Thaqif, over influence in state matters. The Ansar wanted one of their own to succeed the prophet as caliph, but were persuaded by Umar to agree to Abu Bakr. During the reigns of Abu Bakr (632–634) and Umar (r. 634–644), some of the Ansar were concerned about their political stake. The Quraysh apparently held real power during this period marked by the early Muslim conquests. During the First Muslim Civil War, the Ansar, who backed Caliph Ali of the Banu Hashim against two factions representing rival Qurayshi clans, were defeated. They were subsequently left out of the political elite, while the Thaqif maintained a measure of influence by dint of their long relationship with the Quraysh.

A hadith holding that the caliph must be from Quraysh became almost universally accepted by the Muslims, with the exception of the Kharijites. Indeed, control of the Islamic state essentially devolved into a struggle between various factions of the Quraysh. In the first civil war, these factions included the Banu Umayya represented by Mu'awiya ibn Abi Sufyan, the Banu Hashim represented by Ali, and other Qurayshi leaders such as Zubayr ibn al-Awwam of the Banu Asad and Talha ibn Ubayd Allah of the Banu Taym. Later, during the Second Muslim Civil War, these same factions again fought for control of the caliphate, with the Umayyads victorious at the war's conclusion in 692/93. In 750, the issue of which Qurayshi clan would hold the reins of power was again raised but this time, the Abbasids, a branch of the Banu Hashim, were victorious and slew much of the Banu Umayya. Afterward, Islamic leadership was contested between different branches of the Banu Hashim.

Clans

Quraysh relationship tree

See also
 Alaouite dynasty
 Ba 'Alawiyya
 Ba 'Alawi sada
 Hawk of Quraish
 Bannu District

Notes

References

Bibliography

 
 
 
 
 

 
Tribes
Life of Muhammad
Tribes of Arabia
Tribes of Saudi Arabia